Chinna Thambi is a 1991 Indian Tamil-language romantic drama film written and directed by P. Vasu.  The film stars Prabhu as the titular character, an uneducated village simpleton and Khushbu as Nandini, a homeschooled wealthy girl. Manorama, Radha Ravi, Uday Prakash, Rajeshkumar, and Goundamani play supporting roles. The music was composed by Ilaiyaraaja, and the film released on 12 April 1991.

The film was remade in Kannada as Ramachaari (1991), Telugu as Chanti (1992) and Hindi as Anari (1993). The film was one of Prabhu's biggest blockbusters and completed a 356-day run in 9 screens and 100-day run in 47 screens.

Plot 
The film starts with the birth of a baby girl, Nandini, in a rich family on outskirts of Erode. Her three elder brothers throw a feast in honour of her. The young son of the local singer (who had died) is brought in to sing for the event. The three brothers raise Nandini like their own child as their parents had died. At the age of five, an astrologer predicts that Nandini will bring much happiness to the family, but she will marry a person of her choice and not of her brothers' choosing. This angers the brothers, and to prevent this from happening, they raise Nandhini within the confines of the house. She is homeschooled, and when she does go out, all the men are warned to hide from Nandini and that seeing her will be met with dire consequences.

Nandini soon reaches puberty. The few males allowed around her are the service staff and her bodyguards. Meanwhile, the boy who sang, Chinna Thambi, grows up to be a naïve and  gullible simpleton with a heart of gold. He is raised by his widowed mother Kannamma. He does not go to school and spends his time singing and entertaining the people of the village.

One day the bodyguards get into a fight with Chinna Thambi, who defeats them. Impressed with Chinna Thambi's naivete and fighting skills, the brothers hire Chinna Thambi to be Nandini's bodyguard and butler. Nandini meanwhile starts to resent her lack of freedom. She coerces Chinna Thambi to show her the village without her brothers' knowledge. Chinna Thambi complies with her wishes and shows her the village, which results in Nandini falling ill. Chinna Thambi is blamed for Nandini getting sick and is beaten up by the brothers. Nandini, who has just started to like Chinna Thambi, feels guilty for being the reason for him getting thrashed. She shares her medicine with Chinna Thambi, who inadvertently equates Nandini to his mother, as being the few people who truly care for him. This incident brings them closer together emotionally.

One day, a factory worker is punished for leering at Nandini. He plots to kill her at the inauguration of the new factory owned by her brothers. Chinna Thambi overhears the plot, and in a desperate attempt to save Nandini, lunges at her and inadvertently feels her up in public. Nandini does not mind and defends Chinna Thambi by arguing that he would not do something like that in public without good reason. But her brothers are enraged and beat Chinna Thambi to the point that they almost kill him. Nandini stops them and gives him a chance to explain. When Chinna Thambi explains the situation, they hang their heads in shame. Chinna Thambi quits his job on the spot, despite Nandini's silent apology.

At night, Nandini meets Chinna Thambi and apologise and perhaps convince him to come back to the job. Chinna Thambi refuses to come back as he does not want to put up with the violent nature of her brothers. She thinks if Chinna Thambi marries her, they will not be able to manhandle Chinna Thambi. She convinces Chinna Thambi to tie a mangalsutra around her neck, which will protect him from her brothers. Chinna Thambi, without realising the sanctity of the act, does as told and does not realise that he is now married to her.

Chinna Thambi comes back to work and is given a higher level of respect by the brothers for saving Nandini's life. Nandini too starts emulating her sisters-in-law in taking care of her husband. This makes Chinna Thambi nervous, but he still remains clueless. Her change in behaviour is noticed by her sisters-in-law, who urge the brothers to get Nandini married off before she brings shame to the family. Nandini, realising that they are trying to get her married off, tries to make Chinna Thambi understand that they are already married. Chinna Thambi refuses to understand and runs away to his mother, who upon learning what has happened, pulls him out of denial. She sends him away in an attempt to protect him.

The brothers come to know what has happened and torture Kannamma to get her to reveal where her son is hiding. She is saved in time by her son, who almost kills the brothers. The wives of the brothers stop him from killing them and ask him to save Nandini, who has now resorted to self-destruction upon hearing the torturous acts of her brothers. Chinna Thambi rushes back to save his wife and revives her with his singing. Nandini runs towards him and they embrace, with her brothers finally supporting their relationship.

Cast 
 Prabhu as Chinna Thambi
 Khushbu as Nandhini
 Manorama as Kannamma, Chinna Thambi's mother
 Radha Ravi as Nandhini's eldest brother
 Rajeshkumar as Nandhini's second brother
 Uday Prakash as Nandhini's third brother
 Goundamani as Cook Kandhasamy
 Sulakshana as Nandhini's eldest sister-in-law
 Yuvasree as Nandhini's sister-in-law
 Pandu as a domestic help
 Oru Viral Krishna Rao as Kandhasamy's father-in-law
 Master Shakthi as Young Chinna Thambi

Production 
P. Vasu's son Sakthi made his screen debut as a child artist at the age of seven with this film; he appeared as young Prabhu in the film. Khushbu joined the film at Vasu's insistence. Vasu was initially sceptical about casting Manorama as Prabhu's mother as he believed people would compare it to her vastly different role in Vasu's previous film Nadigan (1990), but Manorama remained confident it would not happen. The filming was held at Gobichettipalayam.

Soundtrack 
The soundtrack was composed by Ilaiyaraaja and lyrics were written by Vaali, Ilaiyaraaja and Gangai Amaran. The song "Nee Engey En Anbe" is set to the Carnatic raga Keeravani, as is "Poovoma Oorgolam".  Ilaiyaraaja composed all the songs within 35 minutes. All of them were chartbusters. The film proved to be a breakthrough for playback singer Swarnalatha.

Reception 
The Indian Express wrote, "The conflicts are generated in such a way as to excite the sentiments of lay audiences".

Accolades 
The film won the Tamil Nadu State Film Award for Best Film which met with criticism.

Remakes

Legacy 
Chinna Thambi became a major breakthrough for Prabhu and Khushbu. They became one of the successful lead pairs in Tamil cinema of the 1990s through this film. The success of the film also led the director, actor and actress to collaborate in another project Kizhakku Karai (1991) the following year. After the release, Vasu was conferred "Navarasa Director" award by Amudha Surabhi Kalai Mandram, Madurai.

Khushbu said in 2006, "I am still around only because of Chinna Thambi. None of us imagined it would become the kind of cult film it did. I remember director P. Vasu, hero Prabhu and I were very skeptical about the film while shooting. It was a bold subject at the time, and we thought it would either be a huge flop or a huge hit". Prabhu recalled, "People still talk about Chinna Thambi [...] I still remember my father’s words after the show. "Just as I got a Bhimbsingh, you've got Vasu", he said".

In popular culture 
Vasu alluded to his film's success in a scene in his later film Mannan (1992), in which Krishnan (Rajinikanth) and Muthu (Goundamani) would be seen rushing in the crowd to buy tickets to watch Chinna Thambi. After the film's success, Gobichettipalayam became a shooting hub for many films.

References

Bibliography

External links 
 

1990s Tamil-language films
1991 films
1991 romantic drama films
Films directed by P. Vasu
Films scored by Ilaiyaraaja
Indian romantic drama films
Tamil films remade in other languages